Studniczka  is a settlement in the administrative district of Gmina Czaplinek, within Drawsko County, West Pomeranian Voivodeship, in north-western Poland.

Before 1945/1990 the area was part of Germany.

References

Studniczka